The Individual large hill/10 km event of the FIS Nordic World Ski Championships 2015 was held on 26 February 2015.

Results

Ski jumping
The ski jumping was started at 10:00

Cross-country
The Cross-country was started at 15:15.

References

Individual large hill 10 km